Lieutenant-General John Manners, Marquess of Granby,  (2 January 1721 – 18 October 1770) was a British soldier and the eldest son of the 3rd Duke of Rutland. As he did not outlive his father and inherit the dukedom, he was known by his father's subsidiary title, Marquess of Granby.

Manners served in the Seven Years' War as overall commander of the British troops on the battlefield and was subsequently rewarded with the post of Commander-in-Chief of the Forces. He was popular with his troops and many public houses are still named after him today.

Early life
Born the eldest son of the 3rd Duke of Rutland and Bridget Manners (née Sutton), John Manners was educated at Eton, leaving in 1732 and graduated from Trinity College, Cambridge in 1738. In 1740 he went to Italy on the Grand Tour travelling eastwards to Turkey, returning in 1742.

Elected to Parliament
He was returned as Member of Parliament for the family borough of Grantham in 1741, which was a market town, however its electorate was relatively small and the affairs of its council were in the 18th century sponsored alternately by the titled Manners, Cust, Thorold and Heathcote families who had nearby family estates.

Military career
In 1745 he assisted his father set up a volunteer regiment in Rutland to assist in quelling the Jacobite Rebellion of 1745. Although the regiment was limited to garrison duty at Newcastle, it was the only one of its type that raised its full quota of 780 recruits. Manners received a commission as colonel of the regiment. Even though the regiment never got beyond Newcastle, the young Marquess of Granby went to the front as a volunteer on the Duke of Cumberland's staff and saw active service in the last stages of the insurrection, being present at the Battle of Culloden. In Newcastle the regiment mutinied because they had not been paid but Granby paid the money owed out of his own pocket before they were due to be disbanded.  Thereafter he left England for Flanders as Intelligence Officer to Cumberland.

In 1752, the Government suggested to George II that Granby be appointed colonel of the prestigious Royal Horse Guards (Blues), in order to secure the parliamentary support of his family. The king initially refused to make the appointment. In the meantime, Granby advanced his parliamentary career, and was returned for Cambridgeshire in 1754.

The king came to view him more favourably as he defended the Newcastle ministry in the House of Commons. He was promoted major-general on 18 March 1755, and was at last made Colonel of the Blues on 27 May 1758. On 21 August, Granby arrived at Munster as second in command to Lord George Sackville, as the aged Duke of Marlborough had recently died.  The British cavalry were divided into Heavy and Light cavalry and drilled under the strong influence of George Elliot and Granby himself.  Accredited as the greatest colonel since the Earl of Oxford, Granby was both courageous and competent as a soldier. He was then appointed overall commander of the expedition, replacing Sackville on 21 August 1759. He became Lieutenant-General of the Ordnance on 15 September 1759.

He was one of the first who understood the importance of welfare and morale for the troops.  The character of British soldiering improved and, properly led, the army was unbeatable in war.  Nearly all the portraits show him mounting a horse or helping the wounded. On 7 June 1760 he wrote to Viscount Barrington, Secretary at War, receiving a reply ten days later making enquiries as to the Hospital Board accommodation for his wounded men.

Granby was sent to Paderborn in command of a cavalry brigade. While leading a charge at the Battle of Warburg, he is said to "have lost his hat and wig, forcing him to salute his commander without them".  This incident is commemorated by the British Army tradition that non-commissioned officers and troopers of the Blues and Royals are the only soldiers of the British Army who may salute without wearing headdress. He was promoted to lieutenant general in 1759 and later that year fought at the Battle of Minden as commander of the second line of cavalry under Duke Ferdinand of Brunswick-Wolfenbüttel.

Granby's success in commanding the allied cavalry required courage, control and communication, as well as skill in bringing the horse artillery to bear. The victory at the Battle of Warburg in July 1760 over an army three times the size distinguished his generalship, and marked him as a genuine British military hero.  His opponent, the duc de Broglie, was so impressed that he commissioned a portrait of Granby by Sir Joshua Reynolds.  Further successes came at the Battle of Emsdorf in July 1760, the Battle of Villinghausen in July 1761 and at the Battle of Wilhelmsthal in June 1762.

Political offices
Granby returned to England as a hero: a painting by Edward Penny, The Marquess of Granby Relieving a Sick Soldier, showed him acting as a man of charity rather than as a soldier and this assured his appeal to the people.  He sought to steer a path independent of party politics but supported the Treaty of Paris.  He trusted George Grenville who promptly appointed him Master-General of the Ordnance under his ministry on 14 May 1763. Granby was also made Lord Lieutenant of Derbyshire on 21 February 1764.

Granby supported the government's issue of general warrants and prosecution of Wilkes, but in 1765 spoke against the dismissal of army officers for voting against the government in Parliament.  In May 1765, Lord Halifax attempted to persuade George III to appoint Granby Commander-in-Chief of the Forces, in the hopes that his popularity would help quell the riot of the London silk weavers.  The king refused, having promised the reversion of the post to the Duke of Cumberland, but obtained Granby's retention as Master-General of the Ordnance in the new Rockingham ministry, although Granby did not co-operate with the ministry and voted against the repeal of the Stamp Act.

Under the Chatham Ministry, Granby was appointed commander-in-chief on 13 August 1766. Despite rumours of his retirement, he vigorously electioneered during the 1768 season, and increased the Rutland interests seats to seven, at some expense.  With the resignation of Chatham, he found himself somewhat isolated in the Grafton Ministry.  While he had opposed the attempts of the government to expel Wilkes from his seat in Middlesex, his personal dislike of Wilkes overcame his principles, and he voted in favor of the expulsion on 3 February 1769 and for the seating of Henry Luttrell afterwards.  It was to prove a serious political mistake. Junius, a political writer, attacked the ministry accusing Granby of servility towards the court and personal corruption.  Granby's great popularity might have let him ride out the affair, but his reversal on Wilkes provided new ammunition.  Worse still, a reply to Junius by his friend Sir William Draper, intended in his defence, essentially validated the charge that the hard-drinking and personable Granby was easily imposed upon by less scrupulous acquaintances.

Ultimately, it was not the attacks of Junius, but the return of Chatham that brought about his departure from politics. Granby had always respected Chatham, and through the mediation of John Calcraft, was eventually persuaded to break with the ministry.  On 9 January 1770, he announced that he had reversed himself once more on the propriety of expelling Wilkes, and shortly thereafter resigned as commander-in-chief and Master-General of the Ordnance, retaining only the colonelcy of the Blues.

Once out of office, Granby found himself hard-pressed by his creditors, and the loss of his official salaries had weakened his financial position.  In the summer of 1770, he unsuccessfully campaigned for George Cockburne at the Scarborough by-election.

Death

Granby died at Scarborough, Yorkshire, in 1770. The outpouring of grief was real and sustained. His friend and associate Levett Blackborne, a Lincoln's Inn barrister and Manners family adviser who frequently resided at Belvoir, was away at the time, visiting a family relation of Manners' and received the disturbing news on his return to Belvoir. He wrote to George Vernon at Clontarf on 12 February 1771, bemoaning Granby's proclivities that had brought him to ruin:

"You are no stranger to the spirit of procrastination. The noblest mind that ever existed, the amiable man whom we lament was not free from it. This temper plunged him into difficulties, debts and distresses; and I have lived to see the first heir of a subject in the Kingdom have a miserable shifting life, attended by a levee of duns, and at last die broken-hearted."

He is probably best known today for being popularly supposed to have more pubs named after him than any other person - due, it is said, to his practice of setting up old soldiers of his regiment as publicans when they were too old to serve any longer.

Family
He had two illegitimate children by an unknown mistress:
George Manners (1747–1772)
Anne Manners, married John Manners-Sutton, her first cousin

He married Lady Frances Seymour (1728–1761), daughter of Charles Seymour, 6th Duke of Somerset, on 3 September 1750. According to Horace Walpole, "She has above a hundred and thirty thousand pounds. The Duke of Rutland will take none of it, but gives at present six thousand a-year." They had six children:
John Manners, Lord Roos (29 August 1751 –2 June 1760, London)
Lady Frances Manners (1753 –15 October 1792)
Charles Manners, 4th Duke of Rutland (1754 –1787)
Lady Catherine Manners, died young
Lord Robert Manners (1758 –1782)
Lady Caroline Manners, died young

Footnotes

Sources

External links

|-

|-

1721 births
1770 deaths
Alumni of Trinity College, Cambridge
British Army lieutenant generals
British Army personnel of the Jacobite rising of 1745
British courtesy marquesses
British MPs 1741–1747
British MPs 1747–1754
British MPs 1754–1761
British MPs 1761–1768
British MPs 1768–1774
Heirs apparent who never acceded
John Manners, Marquess of Granby
Lord-Lieutenants of Derbyshire
Members of the Parliament of Great Britain for English constituencies
Members of the Privy Council of Great Britain
People educated at Eton College
Royal Horse Guards officers
British Army personnel of the Seven Years' War
People from Newark and Sherwood (district)